Miodrag Petrović may refer to:

 Miodrag Petrović Čkalja (1924–2003), Serbian actor
 Miodrag Petrović (war artist) (1888–1950), official war artist of the Serbian army during World War I
 Miodrag Petrović (footballer)